Birendra Nagar may refer to several places in Nepal:

Birendranagar, a city in Bheri Zone
Birendra Nagar, Narayani, a village in Chitwan District